The 2018–19 Southeastern Louisiana Lions basketball team represented Southeastern Louisiana University during the 2018–19 NCAA Division I men's basketball season. The Lions were led by fifth-year head coach Jay Ladner, and played their home games at the University Center in Hammond, Louisiana as members of the Southland Conference. They finished the season 17–16 overall, 12–6 in Southland play to finish in a three-way tie for third place. As the No. 3 seed in the Southland tournament, they advanced to the semifinals, where they lost to Abilene Christian.

Previous season
The Lions finished the 2017–18 season 22–12, 15–3 in Southland play to finish in a tie for the Southland regular season championship with Nicholls State. As the No. 1 seed in the Southland tournament, they defeated Sam Houston State in the semifinals before losing in the championship game to Stephen F. Austin. As a regular season champion, and No. 1 seed in their conference tournament, who failed to win their conference tournament, they received an automatic bid to the National Invitation Tournament where they lost in the first round to Saint Mary's.

Schedule and results
Sources:

|-
!colspan=9 style=| Exhibition

|-
!colspan=9 style=| Non-conference regular season

|-
!colspan=9 style=|Southland regular season

|-
!colspan=9 style=| Southland tournament

See also
2018–19 Southeastern Louisiana Lady Lions basketball team

References

Southeastern Louisiana
Southeastern Louisiana Lions basketball seasons
Southeastern Louisiana Lions basketball
Southeastern Louisiana Lions basketball